Sunningdale railway station serves the village of Sunningdale in Berkshire, England.

Services
The station, and all trains serving it, are run by South Western Railway. There are two trains per hour to London Waterloo and two per hour to Reading off-peak, with more frequent services during the weekday morning & evening peak.  Sunday trains also run every half hour, except for Sunday mornings (when the service is limited to one train per hour in each direction).

History
The London and South Western Railway opened the station on 4 June 1856. The station is on the Waterloo to Reading line in Broomhall, prior to boundary changes enacted in 1995. It was part of the civil parish of Windlesham in Surrey.

References

External links

Railway stations in Berkshire
DfT Category C2 stations
Former London and South Western Railway stations
Railway stations in Great Britain opened in 1856
Railway stations served by South Western Railway
1856 establishments in England